Mahmood Mosque is a mosque in Kababir, Haifa, Israel. It was built by the Ahmadiyya Muslim community in the late 1970s.

History  
The first mosque on Mount Carmel was built in 1931. Mahmood Mosque was built in the 1970s. It is named after the second Khalifa of the Ahmadiyya Muslim Community Mirza Basheer-ud-Din Mahmood Ahmad.

The mosque has two white minarets standing 35 metres tall, which dominate the skyline of the residential neighbourhoods on the ridges nearby. Construction of the mosque was funded by members of the local Ahmadiyya community, which moved to Kababir from Ni'lin, a village near Jerusalem.

Kababir is a mixed neighbourhood of Muslim Arabs and Jews  on Mount Carmel. In 1928, most of the residents belonged to the Muslim community .

Gallery

References

External links 

 islamahmadiyya.net: Ahmadiyya Muslim Community
 haifafoundation.com: Historic Sites: Kababir

Islam and Judaism
Ahmadiyya mosques in Israel
Religious buildings and structures in Haifa